The Reinhart Field is a 1,500 seat, expandable to 3,500 seat, multipurpose facility in Bronx, New York within the campus of SUNY Maritime College.  Named after SUNY Maritime Athletic Director, Professor Roger Reinhart, the stadium is home to the Maritime College Privateers soccer,  football, and lacrosse  teams.  In 2012 it also served the Monroe Mustangs of Monroe College as their home field.

Each year the SUNY Maritime Privateers face the Massachusetts Maritime Buccaneers in the annual Chowder Bowl football match, which is usually held as the season opening game for both teams.  The ongoing rivalry has been contested six times.  It has been held at Reinhart Field three years, in 2008,  2010, and 2012,  while the other three were held at the Buccaneers' campus, at Clear Harbor Stadium, in 2007, 2009, and 2013.  The 2011 game was on hiatus.  The Privateers won the first five contests,  with three captured at Reinhart.

Along with the Skyline Conference, the men's and women's Privateers soccer teams face off in non conference matches at Reinhart against local rivalries such as Lehman College  and City College that form part of CUNYAC.

See also
 List of soccer stadiums in the United States

References

External links
 Reinhart Field

State University of New York Maritime College
College football venues
College lacrosse venues in the United States
College soccer venues in the United States
American football venues in New York City
Lacrosse venues in New York City
Multi-purpose stadiums in the United States
Soccer venues in New York City
Sports venues in the Bronx